ζ-Carotene (zeta-carotene) is a carotenoid. It is different from α-carotene and β-carotene because it is acyclic.   ζ-Carotene is similar in structure to lycopene, but has an additional 4 hydrogen atoms. ζ-carotene can be used as an intermediate in forming β-carotene. A dehydrogenation reaction converts ζ-carotene into lycopene, which then can be transformed into β-carotene through the action of lycopene beta-cyclase. ζ-Carotene is a natural product found in Lonicera japonica and Rhodospirillum rubrum.

References 

Carotenoids